Anne, Princess Royal (Anne Elizabeth Alice Louise; born 15 August 1950), is the second child and only daughter of Queen Elizabeth II and Prince Philip, Duke of Edinburgh, and the only sister of King Charles III. Anne is 16th in the line of succession to the British throne and has been Princess Royal since 1987.

Born at Clarence House, Anne was educated at Benenden School and began undertaking royal duties upon reaching adulthood. She became a respected equestrian, winning one gold medal in 1971 and two silver medals in 1975 at the European Eventing Championships. In 1976, she became the first member of the British royal family to compete in the Olympic Games. In 1988, the Princess Royal became a member of the International Olympic Committee (IOC).

Anne performs official duties and engagements on behalf of the King. She is patron or president of over 300 organisations, including WISE, Riders for Health, and Carers Trust. Her work in charities centres on sports, sciences, people with disabilities, and health in developing countries. She has been associated with Save the Children for over fifty years and has visited a number of its projects.

Anne married Captain Mark Phillips in 1973; they separated in 1989 and divorced in 1992. They have two children, Peter Phillips and Zara Tindall, and five grandchildren. Within months of her divorce in 1992, Anne married Commander (later Vice Admiral) Sir Timothy Laurence, whom she had met while he served as her mother's equerry between 1986 and 1989.

Early life and education

Anne was born at Clarence House on 15 August 1950 at 11:50 am during the reign of her maternal grandfather, King George VI. She was the second child and only daughter of Princess Elizabeth, Duchess of Edinburgh (later Queen Elizabeth II), and Philip, Duke of Edinburgh. A 21-gun salute in Hyde Park signalled the birth. Anne was christened in the Music Room of Buckingham Palace on 21 October 1950, by the Archbishop of York, Cyril Garbett. At the time of her birth, she was third in the line of succession to the British throne, behind her mother and older brother, Charles (later King Charles III). She rose to second in 1952 after her grandfather's death and her mother's accession; she is currently 16th in line.

A governess, Catherine Peebles, was appointed to look after Anne and her brothers, Charles, Andrew, and Edward. Peebles was responsible for Anne's early education at Buckingham Palace. Given her young age at the time, Anne did not attend her mother's coronation in June 1953.

A Girl Guides company, the 1st Buckingham Palace Company to include the Holy Trinity Brompton Brownie pack, was re-formed in May 1959, specifically so that, as her mother and aunt had done as children, Anne could socialise with girls her own age. The company was active until 1963, when Anne went to boarding school. Anne enrolled at Benenden School in 1963. In 1968, she left school with six GCE O-Levels and two A-Levels. She began to undertake royal engagements in 1969, at the age of 18.

In 1970, Anne briefly had a relationship with Andrew Parker Bowles, who later married Camilla Shand. Camilla later became the second wife and queen consort of Anne's eldest brother, Charles III. Anne was also briefly linked to Olympic equestrian Richard Meade.

Equestrianism

In spring 1971, Princess Anne finished fourth at the Rushall Horse Trials. At age 21, Anne won the individual title at the European Eventing Championship with her home-bred horse Doublet and was voted the BBC Sports Personality of the Year in 1971. She also rode winners in horse racing, competing in the Grand Military Steeplechase in Sandown Park Racecourse and Diamond Stakes at Royal Ascot.

For more than five years, she also competed with the British eventing team, winning a silver medal in both individual and team disciplines in the 1975 European Eventing Championship. The following year, Anne participated in the 1976 Olympic Games in Montreal as a member of the British team, riding the Queen's horse, Goodwill, in Eventing. Anne suffered a concussion halfway through the course but remounted and finished the event; she has stated she cannot remember making the rest of the jumps. The British team had to pull out of the competition after two horses were injured. She finished fourth at the Badminton Horse Trials in 1974 and sixth in 1979, having participated five times in the competition between 1971 and 1979. In 1985, she rode in a charity horse race at the Epsom Derby, finishing fourth.

Anne assumed the presidency of the Fédération Équestre Internationale from 1986 until 1994. On 5 February 1987, she became the first member of the royal family to appear as a contestant on a television quiz show when she competed on the BBC panel game A Question of Sport. The princess has been a patron of the Riding for the Disabled Association since 1971 and became its president in 1985, a position she still holds.

Marriages and children

Marriage to Mark Phillips

Anne met Mark Phillips, a lieutenant in the 1st Queen's Dragoon Guards, in 1968 at a party for horse lovers. Their engagement was announced on 29 May 1973. On 14 November 1973, the couple married at Westminster Abbey in a televised ceremony, with an estimated audience of 100 million. They subsequently took up residence at Gatcombe Park. As was customary for untitled men marrying into the royal family, Phillips was offered an earldom, which he declined; consequently their children were born without titles. Anne and her husband had two children: Peter (born 1977) and Zara Phillips (born 1981). Anne and Phillips have five grandchildren. On 31 August 1989, Anne and Phillips announced their intention to separate; the couple had been rarely seen in public together and both were romantically linked with other people. They shared custody of their children, and initially announced that "there were no plans for divorce." However, on 13 April 1992 the Palace announced that Anne had filed for divorce, which was finalised ten days later.

Marriage to Sir Timothy Laurence

Anne met Timothy Laurence, a commander in the Royal Navy, while he was serving on the Royal Yacht Britannia. Their relationship developed in early 1989, three years after he was appointed as an equerry to the Queen. In 1989, the existence of private letters from Laurence to the Princess was revealed by The Sun newspaper. The couple married at Crathie Kirk near Balmoral Castle in Scotland, on 12 December 1992. Approximately 30 guests were invited for the private marriage service. Unlike the Church of England at the time, the Church of Scotland considered marriage to be an ordinance of religion rather than a sacrament and permitted the remarriage of divorced persons under certain circumstances. Anne became the first royal divorcée to remarry since Princess Victoria Melita of Saxe-Coburg and Gotha, granddaughter of Queen Victoria.

For the wedding ceremony, Anne wore a white jacket over a "demure, cropped-to-the-knee dress" and a spray of white flowers in her hair. Her engagement ring was made of "a cabochon sapphire flanked by three small diamonds on each side". Following the marriage service, the couple and guests headed to Craigowan Lodge for a private reception. Laurence received no peerage.

Kidnapping attempt
On 20 March 1974, Princess Anne and Mark Phillips were returning to Buckingham Palace from a charity event when a Ford Escort forced their Princess IV car to stop on The Mall. The driver of the Escort, Ian Ball, jumped out and began firing a pistol. Inspector James Beaton, Anne's personal police officer, exited the car to shield her and to try to disarm Ball. Beaton's firearm, a Walther PPK, jammed, and he was shot by Ball, as was Anne's chauffeur, Alex Callender, when he tried to disarm Ball. Brian McConnell, a nearby tabloid journalist, also intervened, and was shot in the chest. Ball approached Anne's car and told her that he intended to kidnap her and hold her for ransom, the sum given by varying sources as £2 million or £3 million, which he claimed he intended to give to the National Health Service. Ball told Anne to get out of the car, to which she replied, "Not bloody likely!" She reportedly briefly considered hitting Ball.

Eventually, Anne exited the other side of the limousine, as had her lady-in-waiting, Rowena Brassey. A passing pedestrian, a former boxer named Ron Russell, punched Ball and led Anne away from the scene. At that point, Police Constable Michael Hills happened upon the scene; he too was shot by Ball, but he had already called for police backup. Detective Constable Peter Edmonds answered, gave chase, and finally arrested Ball.

Beaton, Hills, Callender, and McConnell were hospitalised, and recovered from their wounds. For his defence of Princess Anne, Beaton was awarded the George Cross by the Queen, who was visiting Indonesia when the incident occurred; Hills and Russell were awarded the George Medal, and Callender, McConnell, and Edmonds were awarded the Queen's Gallantry Medal. It was widely reported that the Queen paid off Russell's mortgage, but this is not true: Russell said in 2020 that a police officer suggested it might happen, so he stopped paying his mortgage in anticipation and nearly had his house repossessed after four months. Anne visited Beaton in hospital and thanked him for his assistance. In 1983, she spoke about the event on Parkinson, saying she was 'scrupulously polite' to Ball as she thought it would be 'silly to be too rude at that stage'.

Beaton, who had been Anne's sole bodyguard, later said about royal security "I had nothing… There was no back-up vehicle. The training was non-existent; but then again, [we thought] nothing was going to happen. They are highly specialised now, highly trained." Immediately after the attack the use of only a single protection officer was stopped, and the Walther PPK pistol was replaced.

Ball pleaded guilty to attempted murder and kidnapping. , he was still detained under the Mental Health Act at Broadmoor Hospital, having been diagnosed with schizophrenia.

The attempted kidnapping of Princess Anne is the focus of the Granada Television-produced docudrama To Kidnap a Princess (2006) and inspired story lines in Tom Clancy's novel Patriot Games.

Activities

Anne undertakes a number of duties and engagements on behalf of the sovereign. Kevin S. MacLeod, the then Canadian Secretary to the Queen, said of Anne in 2014: "Her credo is, 'Keep me busy. I'm here to work. I'm here to do good things. I'm here to meet as many people as possible'." It was reported in December 2017 that the Princess Royal had undertaken the most official engagements that year out of all the royal family, her mother the Queen included. Among her royal visits, the Princess has toured Norway, Jamaica, Germany, Austria, New Zealand, and Australia.

Anne's first public engagement was at the opening of an educational and training centre in Shropshire in 1969. Anne travels abroad on behalf of the United Kingdom up to three times a year. She began to undertake overseas visits upon leaving secondary school, and accompanied her parents on a state visit to Austria in the same year.
Her first tour of Australia was with her parents in 1970, since which she returned many times to undertake official engagements as a colonel-in-chief of an Australian regiment, or to attend memorials and services such as the National Memorial Service for victims of the Black Saturday bushfires in Melbourne on 22 February 2009. In 1990 she became the first member of the royal family to make an official visit to the Soviet Union when she went there as a guest of President Mikhail Gorbachev and his government.

Anne is involved with over 200 charities and organisations in an official capacity. She works extensively for Save the Children, serving as president from 1970 to 2017, and has been patron since 2017. Anne has visited the organisation's projects in Bangladesh, Sierra Leone, South Africa, Mozambique, Ethiopia, and Bosnia and Herzegovina. As a result of her work, she was nominated for the Nobel Peace Prize in 1990 by Kenneth Kaunda, President of Zambia. She initiated The Princess Royal Trust for Carers in 1991. Anne is the patron of Transaid, a charity founded by Save the Children and the Chartered Institute of Logistics and Transport which aims to provide safe and sustainable transport in developing countries. She is also the royal patron of WISE, an organisation that encourages young women to pursue careers in science, engineering and construction. Her extensive work for St. John Ambulance as Commandant-in-Chief of St. John Ambulance Cadets has helped to develop many young people, as she annually attends the Grand Prior Award Reception. She is patron of St. Andrew's First Aid. She is a British representative in the International Olympic Committee as an administrator, and was a member of the London Organising Committee for the Olympic Games. She also serves as president of the British Olympic Association. She was president of BAFTA from 1973 to 2001. In 1985 she became president of the Riding for the Disabled Association after serving as their patron for fourteen years. In 1986 she was appointed Master of the Worshipful Company of Carmen. She maintains a relationship with student sport and is the patron of British Universities and Colleges Sport. She has been patron of the Royal National Children's Foundation since 2002 and the industrial heritage museum, Aerospace Bristol, since 2016.

Following the retirement of the Queen Mother in 1981, Anne was elected by graduates of the University of London as the Chancellor, and has been in the position since that year. Throughout May 1996, Anne served as Her Majesty's High Commissioner to the General Assembly of the Church of Scotland, and held the post again in 2017. In 2007, she was appointed by the Queen as Grand Master of the Royal Victorian Order, a position her grandmother had also held. She is a Royal Fellow of the Royal Society and the Academy of Medical Sciences. Royal Fellows are members of the royal family who are recommended and elected by the Society's Council. The Royal Society  has four Royal Fellows: Anne; William, Prince of Wales; Edward, Duke of Kent; and King Charles. She is the Academy of Medical Sciences' first Royal Fellow.

Anne was elected Chancellor of the University of Edinburgh effective 31 March 2011, succeeding her father, who stepped down from the role in 2010. Likewise, she accepted in 2011 the roles of president of City and Guilds of London Institute, Master of the Corporation of Trinity House and president of the Royal Society of Arts, also in succession to her father. Anne has been the president of the Commonwealth Study Conference, an initiative founded by her father. She is also patron of the Royal College of Occupational Therapists, Royal College of Midwives, Magpas Air Ambulance, Edinburgh University's Royal (Dick) School of Veterinary Studies, Royal Holloway, University of London, International Students House, London, Acid Survivors Trust International, Townswomen's Guilds, Citizens Advice, the Royal Edinburgh Military Tattoo, and the Scottish Rugby Union.

Anne represented Great Britain in the International Olympic Committee at the 2014 Sochi Winter Olympics in Russia. In August 2016, she returned to the country to visit the Russian city of Arkhangelsk for the 75th anniversary of Operation Dervish, which was one of the first Arctic convoys of World War II. In September 2016, the Princess had a chest infection and was required to cancel official engagements. In late October 2016, she visited the Malaysian state of Sarawak for a two-day study tour. In 2017, she became Prime Warden of the Worshipful Company of Fishmongers and a Governor of Gresham's School. In 2021, she became patron of Mercy Ships, an international charity that operates the largest non-governmental hospital ships in the world.

In April 2022, Anne and her husband toured Australia and Papua New Guinea to mark the Queen's Platinum Jubilee. In the same year, Anne was named honorary chair of National Lighthouse Museum's Illuminating Future Generations campaign, a project aimed at rasising funds for the museum's gallery space.

On 12 September 2022, in St Giles' Cathedral, Edinburgh, Anne became the first woman to participate in a Vigil of the Princes, guarding her mother's coffin. This was repeated at Westminster Hall on 16 September. It was later revealed that she had been the informant at her mother's death at Balmoral, a witness who signs, along with the doctor, the death certificate.

Public image and style

Anne has been called the royal family's "trustiest anchor" and a "beacon of good, old-fashioned public service", having carried out over 20,000 engagements since her 18th birthday. In her early adulthood, she was cited as a "royal renegade" for choosing to forgo titles for her children despite being the "spare to the heir". The media often called the young Anne "aloof" and "haughty", giving her the nickname "her royal rudeness". She spurred controversy for telling photographers to "naff off" at the Badminton Horse Trials in 1982. Vanity Fair wrote that Anne "has a reputation for having inherited her father's famously sharp tongue and waspish wit". Of her early public role, she has said: "It's not just about 'can I get a tick in the box for doing this?' No, it's about serving…It took me probably 10 years before I really felt confident enough to contribute to Save the Children's public debates because you needed to understand how it works on the ground and that needed a very wide coverage. So my early trips were really important." Anne has been frequently named the "hardest working royal", and she carried out 214 engagements in 2022, more than any other member of the royal family.

Anne remains one of Britain's most popular royals. Telegraph Editor Camilla Tominey called her a "national treasure", writing that she is "hailed as one of the great English eccentrics", whose work ethic contributes to her regard. Tominey wrote that Anne's public role is a "contradiction of both protocol taskmaster and occasional rule-breaker". Reportedly, Anne "insists on doing her own make-up and hair" and drives herself to engagements, having pleaded guilty to two separate speeding fines on account of being late. She does not shake hands with the public during walkabouts, saying, "the theory was that you couldn't shake hands with everybody, so don't start." Members of the public have seen her "mending fences at Gatcombe" and "queuing up for the Portaloos" at her daughter's horse competitions. Her reputation is also coupled with her advocacy for causes out of the mainstream, such as Wetwheels Foundation's commitment to accessible sailing and the National Lighthouse Museum. On her 60th and 70th birthdays, the BBC and Vanity Fair both asked whether she would retire, and she denied it both times, citing her parents' example as well as her commitment to her royal duties. Anne's public personality has been described as "not suffering fools lightly" while maintaining a "still-impressive level of grace and courtesy".

British Vogue editor Edward Enninful has said that "Princess Anne is a true style icon and was all about sustainable fashion before the rest of us really knew what that meant". Her style has been noted for its timelessness; she relies almost solely on British fashion brands, with tweed and tailored suits as her hallmarks. She is known for recycling outfits, such as her floral-print dress worn both to the wedding of the Prince of Wales in 1981 and the wedding of Lady Rose Windsor in 2008. Anne is the patron of U.K. Fashion and Textile Association. She has been noted for wearing "bold patterns and vibrant pops of colour". Her style choices often reflect her equestrian interests as well as the practicality of her fast-paced schedule. In the 1970s and 1980s, she was often photographed wearing trends such as puff sleeves, cardigans, bright floral patterns, and multicoloured stripes. Anne is also one of the few women in the royal family to wear a military uniform. According to The Guardian, she is "rarely seen without a brooch" during royal events. Her millinery styles have included jockey caps and hats of multiple colours and bold patterns. She presented the Queen Elizabeth II award for British design at London Fashion Week in 2020. Anne has appeared on three British Vogue covers; after first appearing on the 1971 September issue at age 21, she also featured in the May and November 1973 issues, commemorating her engagement to Mark Phillips. She was featured in the cover story for the May 2020 issue of Vanity Fair.

Anne is the first member of the royal family to have been convicted of a criminal offence. In November 2002, she pleaded guilty to one charge of having a dog dangerously out of control, an offence under the Dangerous Dogs Act 1991, and was fined £500.

Titles, styles, honours and arms

Titles and styles
Anne is the seventh Princess Royal, an appellation given only to the eldest daughter of the sovereign. The previous holder was King George V's daughter, Princess Mary, Countess of Harewood, Anne's grandaunt.

Arms

Issue

Ancestry 
The Princess Royal's ancestry can be traced as far back as Cerdic, King of Wessex (519–534).

Bibliography

Guest-editor
"HRH The Princess Royal: Guest Editor". Country Life. 29 July 2020.

Notes

References

External links

 The Princess Royal at the royal family website
 The Princess Royal at the website of the Government of Canada
 
 

 
1950 births
Living people
20th-century British people
21st-century British people
20th-century British women
21st-century British women
BBC Sports Personality of the Year winners
British event riders
British female equestrians
British princesses
Chancellors of the University of Edinburgh
Chancellors of the University of London
Children of Elizabeth II
Companions of the Queen's Service Order
Dames Grand Cross of the Order of St John
Dames Grand Cross of the Royal Victorian Order
Daughters of monarchs
English Anglicans
English people of Danish descent
English people of German descent
English people of Greek descent
English people of Russian descent
English people of Scottish descent
Equestrians at the 1976 Summer Olympics
Fellows of King's College London
Fellows of the Royal Scottish Geographical Society
Female admirals
Female Fellows of the Royal Academy of Engineering
Female Fellows of the Royal Society
Grand Companions of the Order of Logohu
Grand Cordons of the Order of the Precious Crown
Grand Crosses of the Order of the House of Orange
Honorary air commodores
House of Windsor
International Olympic Committee members
Knights of the Garter
Knights of the Thistle
Lords High Commissioner to the General Assembly of the Church of Scotland
Members of Trinity House
Mountbatten-Windsor family
Olympic equestrians of Great Britain
People associated with Harper Adams University
People educated at Benenden School
People from Westminster
Presidents of the British Science Association
Presidents of the Smeatonian Society of Civil Engineers
Princesses Royal
Recipients of the Grand Decoration with Sash for Services to the Republic of Austria
Recipients of the Order of Isabella the Catholic
Royal Navy admirals
Royal Olympic participants
Spanish Riding School
Wives of knights
Women in the British Army
Women in the Royal Navy
Women's Royal Naval Service officers